Christopher Matthew Zebroski (born 29 October 1986) is an English footballer who plays as a forward for Melksham Town.

Club career
Zebroski was a youth player for his hometown club Swindon Town, but was released after failing to earn a professional contract. After his release there he trained under the watch of former Wales international Steve Lowndes at Cirencester football academy, it was from here that he was spotted by scouts of Championship club Plymouth Argyle and signed as a youth player by the club. He later signed a professional contract, and made four first-team appearances for Argyle before his contract was terminated after he was found guilty of gross misconduct by the club. This followed an incident involving the club captain Paul Wotton.

Three weeks after  leaving  Plymouth Argyle, he was signed for Millwall by manager Nigel Spackman. On 21 March 2007, Zebroski joined Oxford United on a month's loan. On 31 July 2007, Zebroski signed for Conference National side Torquay United on loan until May 2008, and went on to score 19 goals in league and cup competitions during the 2007–08 season.

He was transferred to Wycombe Wanderers for £20,000 in June 2008. Zebroski finished the 2008–09 season with seven goals from 33 league matches, mostly from the wing, helping the team win promotion to League One. The start of the 2009–10 season saw Zebroski score two goals in a 3–2 defeat at Charlton Athletic.On 20 November 2009, Zebroski returned to Torquay United on loan with a view to permanent transfer in January. On 26 November 2010 Zebroski was given a 12-month community order and fine for kicking and punching a soldier in a street fight in Torquay in August 2010. He scored twice in a 5–0 home win against Darlington on 12 December and the move later became permanent.

After helping the club avoid relegation from League Two during the 2009–10 campaign, Zebroski scored 16 league goals to help the club finish seventh and reach the play-offs the following season. In the semi-final first leg versus Shrewsbury at Plainmoor, Zebroski scored the first goal to set up a 2–0 victory. The second leg finished 0–0, leaving Torquay to play Stevenage in the play-off final at Old Trafford. Stevenage won the match 1–0. In July 2011 he followed former Torquay manager Paul Buckle to his new club, Bristol Rovers.

In August 2012 Zebroski joined Cheltenham Town. His contract with Cheltenham was cancelled by mutual consent on 4 January 2013 after Zebroski withdrew from the matchday squad at short notice on a number of occasions.

On Monday 25 February 2013, it was announced that Zebroski had joined Conference South side Eastleigh. He scored his first goal for the club in the 1–0 win over Eastbourne Borough on 2 March 2013.

On 5 June 2013 Zebroski signed for newly promoted League Two club Newport County. In April 2015 he was jailed for 4 years and 4 months after he "admitted four charges of robbery, attempted robbery and assault relating to two incidents". Zebroski attributed the incidents to alcoholism, and failed in an appeal against the sentence. He served two years of his sentence at HMP Prescoed, and was released in 2017.

Following his release from prison, Zebroski rejoined Eastleigh in June 2017.

On 8 August 2019, Zebroski signed for National League South side Chippenham Town. He departed the club in May 2021.

Zebroski joined Hellenic Football League Division One side Malmesbury Victoria in August 2021. Less than one month later, he joined Southern Football League Premier Division South side Swindon Supermarine. In December 2021 he transferred to Wantage Town. Following Wantage Town's relegation, Zebroski joined Melksham Town in July 2022.

Career statistics

Honours
Wycombe Wanderers
Football League Two Third Place (Promoted): 2008–09
Newport Player of the Season 2013–2014

References

External links

1986 births
Living people
Sportspeople from Swindon
English footballers
Association football forwards
Swindon Town F.C. players
Plymouth Argyle F.C. players
Millwall F.C. players
Oxford United F.C. players
Torquay United F.C. players
Wycombe Wanderers F.C. players
Bristol Rovers F.C. players
Cheltenham Town F.C. players
Eastleigh F.C. players
Newport County A.F.C. players
Chippenham Town F.C. players
Malmesbury Victoria F.C. players
Swindon Supermarine F.C. players
Wantage Town F.C. players
Melksham Town F.C. players
English Football League players
National League (English football) players
Black British sportspeople
English prisoners and detainees
English people convicted of assault
Prisoners and detainees of England and Wales
Sportspeople convicted of crimes